Pascal Jules (22 July 1961, in La Garenne-Colombes – 25 October 1987, in Bernay) was a French professional road bicycle racer.

Career
Jules was a close friend of Laurent Fignon whom he rode with at Renault–Elf  between 1982 and 1985. Jules won one stage in the 1984 Tour de France. With Fignon, Marc Madiot and Greg LeMond, Jules was part of a quartet in that Renault team who were keen to succeed the legendary Bernard Hinault. However, after being thrown back by injury and a fight with team director Cyrille Guimard, he joined Marino Lejarreta's Seat–Orbea team.

Death
He died in 1987 following a car crash in Normandy, after returning from a football match for a charitable association.

In his autobiography entitled Nous étions jeunes et insouciants ("We were young and carefree")   Laurent Fignon remembers Pascal Jules by saying: 
"It was unsaid but there was a pact of kinship between us which was so strong, so inviolable, almost sacred, that it would last as long as life lasted. But some lives don't last that long."

Personal life
Jules was the father of Justin Jules, who became a professional cyclist himself.

Career achievements

Major results

1982
Fontenay-sous-Bois
1983
Quilan
Tour de Picardie
Circuit Cycliste de la Sarthe
1984
Tour de France:
Winner stage 8
Chateau-Chinon
1985
Circuit Cycliste de la Sarthe

Grand Tour general classification results timeline

See also

References

External links 

Official Tour de France results for Pascal Jules

1961 births
1987 deaths
People from La Garenne-Colombes
French male cyclists
French Tour de France stage winners
Sportspeople from Hauts-de-Seine
Cyclists from Île-de-France